Hemibagrus fortis is a species of bagrid catfish found in the Rajang basin in Sarawak, Malaysia. This catfish share the common name ikan Baung or 白须公 with another similar species Hemibagrus nemurus.

References

Parenti, L.R. and K.K.P. Lim, 2005. Fishes of the Rajang basin, Sarawak, Malaysia. Raffles Bull. Zool. Supplement (13):175-208.

Bagridae
Fish of Asia
Fish of Malaysia
Taxa named by Canna Maria Louise Popta
Fish described in 1904